Al-Bahri Stadium is a football specific stadium in Basra, Iraq. It is the new home of Al-Bahri SC, currently playing in the Iraq Division One. The stadium has a capacity of 7,000 spectators, fully seated and all sheltered.

Notable events 
The stadium was inaugurated on 16 March 2022, with a friendly match between Al-Bahri SC and Al-Mina'a SC. It ended with a 1–1 draw, with Abdullah Wasfi (player of Al-Mina'a SC) being the first player to score in the new stadium.

See also 
List of football stadiums in Iraq

References 

Football venues in Iraq
Buildings and structures in Basra
Sports venues completed in 2022